Chaudhry Hamid Nasir Chattha is a politician from Wazirabad, Punjab, Pakistan. He was born on November 15, 1944 in Lahore. Hamid Nasir Chattha is currently a Member of Punjab Assembly, Pakistan after losing in 2008 National Assembly elections against his long term rival Chaudhry Shahnawaz Cheema. He was previously elected as an MNA in 1985, 1990, 1993, and 2002 from his constituency of Gujranwala. Married, he is the father of two sons and two daughters.

Early life and family
Hamid Nasir Chatha is the son of Ch. Salah-ud-Din Chatha. He has two sons, Fayyaz Chatha and Ahmad Chatha.

Education and career
Hamid Nasir Chattha attended Aitchison College in Lahore. He received his bachelor's and master's degrees in political science from Government College Lahore in 1966 followed by Bar-at-Law from Lincoln's Inn, London. He was not able to complete his Bar at Law exam because of his father's death.

Later career
Between 1981 and 1985 Hamid Nasir Chattha served as Provincial Minister of Punjab holding the portfolio of Health and Education. Hamid Nasir won one of the biggest majorities in the Punjab in the 1985 party less elections. He then went on to serve as Speaker of the National Assembly from 1986 to 1988.

As a federal minister, he held the portfolio of Information and Broadcasting and Science and Technology during 1985–1986 and later the portfolio of Planning during 1990–1993. He was the chairman of the special committee of Kashmir with the status of federal minister.

He broke with the PML and IJI coalition led by Nawaz Sharif on 17 April 1993, a day before the government was dismissed by President Ghulam Ishaq Khan. He went on to join the PML-J, originally founded by the late Mohammed Khan Junejo. His party has had two chief ministers of the Punjab and one foreign minister when his party was a coalition partner with PPP-P.

He joined PTI in 2016 and is considered a leftist leader within the PTI.

See also
 Politics of Pakistan
 Manzoor Wattoo

References

1944 births
Government College University, Lahore alumni
Living people
Members of Lincoln's Inn
Pakistan Muslim League (Q) politicians
People from Wazirabad
Punjabi people
Politicians from Lahore
Speakers of the National Assembly of Pakistan
Pakistani MNAs 1985–1988
Pakistani MNAs 1990–1993
Pakistani MNAs 1993–1996
Pakistani MNAs 2002–2007